The 10th Air Army was a unit of the Soviet Air Forces during World War II and the Cold War years.

World War II 

The unit was originally formed on Sakhalin Island on August 15, 1942, on the basis of the Air Force of the 25th Army of the Far Eastern Front of the USSR Armed Forces.

In August-early September 1945, the 10th Air Army as part of the 2nd Far Eastern Front, participated in the Sungari Offensive Operation, during which it covered the units of the 15th Army, supported the landing of the Amur Flotilla in the city of Fuyuan, then the offensive towards Qiqihar. The efforts of the 18th Corps disrupted the enemy's rail traffic.

A number of the Army's formations performed combat missions during the Invasion of South Sakhalin and Invasion of the Kuril Islands. During the period of hostilities, the 10th Air Army carried out about 3297 sorties.

On 3 September 1945 it included:
18th Mixed Aviation Corps
96th Assault Aviation Division
296th Fighter Aviation Division
777th Fighter Aviation Regiment
140th Reconnaissance Aviation Squadron
28th Artillery Correction Squadron
83rd Bomber Aviation Division
128th Mixed Aviation Division
255th Mixed Aviation Division
253rd Assault Aviation Division
29th Fighter Aviation Division
254th Fighter Aviation Division
7th Reconnaissance Aviation Regiment
411th Artillery Correction Regiment
344th Transport Aviation Regiment

Cold War 
In July 1948 it was transferred to Vozzhayevka airfield west of Khabarovsk.

By a directive of 10 January 1949, it became the 29th Air Army.

As of 1950, the army operated airfields at Vozzhayevka, Pozdeyevka (Pozdeevka), Zavitinsk (Zavitaya), and Kuibyshevka.

In 1957, the 29th Air Army was amalgamated with the 54th Air Army, and became the 1st Special Far Eastern Air Army.

Commanders  
 27.07.1942 - 16.09.1944 : Major General of Aviation Vasiliy Aleksandrovich Vinogradov.
 16.09.1944 - 19.05.1945 : Colonel David Yakovlevich Slobozhan. 
 09.05.1945 - 02.04.1946 : Colonel General of Aviation Pavel Fedorovich Zhigarev.  
 25.05.1946 - 12.01.1949 : Lieutenant General of Aviation Nikolay Filippovich Papivin.

References

Further reading 
 
 
 
 

Air armies of the Soviet Air Forces
Air armies of the Red Air Force in World War II
Military units and formations established in 1942
Military units and formations disestablished in 1949